Anariacae is an ancient Caucasian people mentioned by Polybius, Strabo, and Pliny. Ptolemy erroneously called them Amariacae (Ἀμαριάκαι).  

The Armenian geographer Anania Shirakatsi mentions Anariacae (‘Anariaki’ in Armenian) among the people inhabiting the northern parts of Media.

References
 

Ancient peoples